HITZ (as Hitz FM on radio) is a Malaysian national radio station managed by Astro Radio, a subsidiary of Astro Holdings Berhad. The radio station name was changed from Hitz.FM to Hitz FM in 2014. The radio has regional stations in Kota Kinabalu and Kuching. In 2015, as according to Nielsen RAM Survey Wave #1, Hitz FM maintained its position as Malaysia's leading English-language station with over 1.2 million listeners. Hitz FM has a weekly audience of more than 2.2M listeners on radio. It targets listeners between the age of 10 to 29, according to Astro Radio. The radio station's slogan is "Malaysia's #1 Hit Music Station."

History 
January 1997 - HITZ FM was launched into Malaysian FM airwaves in January 1997 after being one of Astro's audio-only channels since the launch of the satellite network in October the year before.

2000 - the Malaysian Top 10 (later renamed Malaysian English Top 10) was introduced, airing every Sundays at 4pm to bring the limelight into local Malaysian music which would suit the tastes of Hitz FM's listeners, especially indie acts.

April 2001: HITZ FM undergoes rebranding as Hitz.FM (with a dot), introduces new online features like webcasts of their on-air announcers in action and radio streaming.

In August 2003, a rift between Li'l Kev and the management of AMP (Airtime Management and Programming) over the contract between them caused him and FlyGuy to leave Hitz.FM abruptly. Jason Lo and Rudy Sufian were called up to fill in their places and eventually became the new Morning Crew. (Later, Lo switched time slots with JJ Fernandez for the drive-home slot.) Later in the same year, HITZ.TV (Astro Hitz) was launched as a complement to the radio channel until it ceased broadcasting on 16 May 2016.

2005: The introduction of the Hitz FM Malaysian English Top 10 Awards to "honour the best of Malaysian English-singing musical talent and compositions".

2008: Rudy announced his decision to give up his morning show, confessing to having problems getting up in the mornings and needed to change his work pattern. Ean (real name Tengku Mohd Ean Nasrun) takes his place alongside JJ following the resignation until 2016.

September 2010: Hitz.FM was launched alongside its respective Malay and Chinese counterparts Era FM and My FM in East Malaysia - the three channels began broadcasting in Kuching on 25 October of that year followed by Kota Kinabalu on 1 December.

2014: Hitz.FM was rebranded again, this time it reverted to its original name, Hitz FM.

On 1 January 2018, the station, along with 10 other radio stations dropped the suffix "FM" from its brand name as part of the Astro Radio’s major rebranding project to focus on digital platforms. A new logo for Hitz was also unveiled during the rebranding.

On 19 October 2020, Hitz ended their "Gotcha" calls after more than a decade. It was a popular prank call segment on the Hitz Morning Crew show hosted by Ean and Arnold.

On 19 February 2021, Yusuf Shukri (widely known as Yusuf), an announcer from HITZ Sarawak received backlash and condemnation when he uploaded a video on his personal TikTok account that belittled the English intonation of a Science teacher, Rafidah Rahmat about human reproduction in the newly launched DidikTV channel by the Ministry of Education. Following the incident, Yusuf was suspended from his duties by Hitz and Astro Radio's management board while they investigate the matter. He then apologized for the outrageous action caused by him through a video posted on his Instagram. Three days later, Hitz accepted his resignation and have confirmed that Yusuf has resigned from his role as an announcer, the station did not elaborate on findings from an internal inquiry it launched after that deleted TikTok video of Yusuf.

Beginning 18 June 2021, HITZ started streaming their radio webcast through YouTube live on its channel round the clock non-stop.

Frequency

Internet radio
Note: Internet radio broadcast online on SYOK website and SYOK App.
Hitz TikTok
Hitz Dance
Hitz Urban
Hitz Workout
Hitz Top 40
Hitz Local
Hitz Throwback
Hitz Chillest
Hitz Kpop

Television satellite
 Astro (television): Channel 852
Notes: Hitz Sabah and Hitz Sarawak are not available via Astro satellite TV.

References

External links 
 
HITZ stream on YouTube
HITZ Xcelerate on Mixcloud

1997 establishments in Malaysia
Radio stations established in 1997
Radio stations in Malaysia